Kitab al-Tabikh or Kitab al-Ṭabīḫ (The Book of Dishes) is the name of two medieval Arab cookbooks from Baghdad:
 Kitab al-Tabikh (10th c.), written in the 10th century by Ibn Sayyar al-Warraq
 Kitab al-Tabikh (1226), written in 1226 by Muhammad bin Hasan al-Baghdadi (d. 1239 AD)

It may also refer to the Kitāb al-Ṭabikh fī al-Maghrib wa al-Andalus fī ʽAṣr al-Muwaḥḥidīn, li-muʽallif majhūl

10th-century Arabic books
13th-century Arabic books
Arab cuisine
Cookbooks of the medieval Islamic world